Loving is an English surname. Notable people with the surname include:

Alvin D. Loving (1935–2005), African-American painter
Candy Loving (born 1956), American model
Cynthia Loving or Lil' Mo (born 1975), American R&B singer and radio personality
Dwight J. Loving, American soldier on death row
Frank Loving (1860–1882), American Old West gambler and gunman
George G. Loving, Jr. (born 1923), American retired Air Force lieutenant general
James C. Loving (1836-1902), American cattleman and rancher in Texas.
Mildred and Richard Loving, the plaintiffs in Loving v. Virginia
Oliver Loving (1812–1867), American cattle rancher and pioneer
Susan B. Loving, American lawyer, Oklahoma's first female attorney general
Walter Loving (1872--1945), American soldier and musician, leader of the Philippine Constabulary Band
Warren Loving (born 1960), American football player

See also
 Lovin

References

English-language surnames